Calliotropis echidnoides is a species of sea snail, a marine gastropod mollusk in the family Eucyclidae.

Description
The length of the shell reaches 5 mm.

Distribution
This marine species occurs off Tonga and New Caledonia.

References

External links
 

echidnoides
Gastropods described in 2007